Raijieli Victoria "Rachel" Laqeretabua is a Fijian rugby union player. She played for Richmond in the Premier 15s before joining Saracens in 2019.

Rugby career

Super W 
Laqeretabua was named in the Fijiana Drua squad for the 2022 Super W season. She made her Super W debut against the Reds in round two. She then scored her first try in round three against the Western Force. She featured in the match against the Waratahs, Fijiana Drua handed them their first Super W loss after a 20-game winning streak. She played against the Waratahs again in the Grand Final, the Fijiana Drua went to win the Super W competition in their debut season.

International 
Laqeretabua was named in the Fijiana squad for two test matches against Australia and Japan in May 2022. She was in the starting lineup in the test against the Wallaroos.

Laqeretabua was selected in the Fijiana squad for the 2022 Oceania Championship in New Zealand. She scored a try in the 152–0 trouncing of Papua New Guinea. She featured against Tonga and scored a try against Samoa in the final round. In September she played in a warm up match against Canada. She was also named in the Fijiana squad for the 2021 Rugby World Cup.

References 

Year of birth missing (living people)
Living people
Female rugby union players
Fijian female rugby union players
Fiji women's international rugby union players